Streptomyces chiangmaiensis is a bacterium species from the genus of Streptomyces which has been isolated from the bee Tetragonilla collina in the Chiang Mai Province in Thailand.

See also 
 List of Streptomyces species

References

Further reading

External links
Type strain of Streptomyces chiangmaiensis at BacDive -  the Bacterial Diversity Metadatabase

chiangmaiensis
Bacteria described in 2013